Jayasri Burman (born 1960 in Calcutta) is a contemporary artist from Indian. She studied at the Kala Bhavan in Shantiniketan, and at the Government College of Art and Craft, Kolkata, where she completed a Master of Arts in painting. 

She is a member of an extended family of eminent artists: her husband, Paresh Maity; uncle Sakti Burman who lives and works in France.

Exhibitions 

Exhibitions

2010 - 'Summer Show 2010', Centre of International Modern Art (CIMA), Kolkata

Selected Solo Exhibitions

2014 - ‘Gazing into Myth’, by Gallery Sumukha, Hong Kong

2010 - ‘Fables and Folklore’, presented by Art Musings at Jehangir Art Gallery, Mumbai

2010 - ‘The Mythical Universe’, Art Alive Gallery, New Delhi

Awards and recognition 
She has played an active role in ‘Ananya Festival’ a week-long celebration by the Ministry of Women and Child Development for International Women's Day during 5–9 March 2007. These stamps have been designed by Jayasri and was released by the Hon’ble Vice President of India.

Other Notable Honours and Awards

 1987 Certificate of Merit, All India Youth Art Exhibition

 1985 National Award

 1979 Awards given by the College of Visual Arts in Tempera for Outstanding Merit in the Annual Exhibition She was also previously a National Academy Award Winner for the 1984 painting Jeley (The Fisherman)

References

External links
Official Website 

1960 births
Living people
20th-century Indian painters
20th-century Indian women artists
21st-century Indian painters
21st-century Indian women artists
Bengali artists
French people of Indian descent
French Hindus
Visva-Bharati University alumni
Government College of Art & Craft alumni
University of Calcutta alumni
Indian women painters
Artists from Kolkata
Painters from West Bengal
Women artists from West Bengal